Alfred Paolo Conteh is a retired Major in the Sierra Leone Armed Forces who has been Defense Minister of Sierra Leone since October 2007. He was appointed by President Ernest Bai Koroma and was later confirmed by parliament. Conteh is the nephew of former President Joseph Saidu Momoh.

Conteh is a keen sprinter and sportman. He was Sierra Leone's 400m record holder in 1982; and its record remains unbroken since. He plays football, volleyball, handball, squash and tennis.

Born and raised in Freetown, to parents from the Limba ethnic group, Conteh enrolled in the Sierra Leone Army as a cadet officer in 1976. In 1981, Conteh became one of the commanding officers of the Sierra Leone Military Police unit, a branch of the Sierra Leone Army.

Conteh went to law school in the United Kingdom. He obtained the Bachelor of Laws Degree (LLB) from the University of London LLB (law) in 1990. He was called to the Bar of England and Wales in 1992. He also obtained a Master of Laws (LLM) from the Holborn School of Law in the United Kingdom.

Early life
Alfred Paolo Conteh was born and raised in the neighborhood of Wilberforce in Freetown, Sierra Leone to parents from the Limba ethnic group.

Military service
Upon graduation from secondary school, Conteh enrolled in the Sierra Leone Army as a cadet officer in 1976. Upon completion of a two-year cadet training in 1978, Conteh was promoted to Second Lieutenant in the Sierra Leone Army and was posted as Platoon Commander at the Benguema barracks in Benguema, Sierra Leone.

In 1981, Conteh became one of the commanding officers of the Sierra Leone Military Police unit, a branch of the Sierra Leone Army. In 1983, Conteh was promoted to Captain.

Law school
He went to law school in 1986 in the United Kingdom. He obtained the Bachelor of Laws Degree (LLB) from the University of London LLB (law) in 1990. He was called to the Bar of England and Wales in 1992. He also obtained a Master of Laws (LLM) from the Holborn School of Law in the United Kingdom.

External links
"Combat-Clad Minister Shocks Sierra Leone", Awareness Times, 11 January 2008.
http://www.thepatrioticvanguard.com/spip.php?article1926

Sierra Leonean military personnel
Defence ministers of Sierra Leone
All People's Congress politicians
Living people
Alumni of the University of London
People from Freetown
Year of birth missing (living people)